Sonia Shehzad Khan is a Pakistani journalist. In 2015, she appeared as a news reporter at Jaag TV. She also works for Samaa TV and now she was in UIT University as Public Relations Officer.

Life and career
Sonia Shehzad was born in Karachi, Pakistan. She started her career by joining Jaag TV where she worked as a journalist and anchor.

References

External links
 
SONIA SHEHZAD SAMAA TV Report on Samaa TV
SONIA SHEHZAD SAMAA TV on Samaa TV
SONIA SHEHZAD REPORTS SAMAA TV on Samaa TV

Living people
Pakistani women journalists
Journalists from Karachi
Year of birth missing (living people)